Major-General Hayman John Hayman-Joyce CBE DSO (2 May 1897 – 7 July 1958) was a senior British Army officer who commanded the 4th Infantry Division during World War II.

Military career
Hayman-Joyce served as a lieutenant in the Border Regiment during the First World War.

After attending the Staff College, Camberley from 1933 to 1934, he was given command of 5th Battalion, King's Own Royal Regiment (Lancaster) in France in 1940. He was appointed Commander of 6th Brigade later that year, General Officer Commanding (GOC) of the 48th (South Midland) Division in December 1941, and GOC of the 4th Infantry Division in August 1943. The 4th Division saw service in North Africa and took part in the allied invasion of Italy under his command. His last appointment was as GOC British Troops in Egypt in 1944, before he retired in 1947.

He married Maydie Swann; they had two daughters and a son.

References

Bibliography

External links
Generals of World War II

|-

1897 births
1958 deaths
Burials in Somerset
People from East Sussex
Military personnel from Sussex
British Army generals of World War II
British Army personnel of World War I
Commanders of the Order of the British Empire
Companions of the Distinguished Service Order
Border Regiment officers
Graduates of the Royal Military College, Sandhurst
Graduates of the Staff College, Camberley
British Army major generals